Caldicellulosiruptor is a genus of thermophilic, anaerobic, Gram-positive, non-spore forming bacteria. Originally placed within the highly polyphyletic class Clostridia, order Thermoanaerobacterales and family Thermoanaerobacterales Family III according to the NCBI and LPSN, it is now thought to lie outside of the Bacillota. Caldicellulosiruptor is known to degrade and ferment complex carbohydrates from plant matter, such as cellulose and hemicellulose (hence its name), and certain species in the genus have been identified as potential candidates for biofuel production.

Phylogeny
The currently accepted taxonomy is based on the List of Prokaryotic names with Standing in Nomenclature (LPSN) and National Center for Biotechnology Information (NCBI)

See also
 List of bacterial orders
 List of bacteria genera

References 

Thermoanaerobacterales
Bacteria genera
Thermophiles
Anaerobes